Reckless Kelly is an American country rock band. Formed in Stanley, Idaho, the band moved to Austin, Texas in October 1996 and is now based there.

History
Led by brothers Willy (vocals/guitar) and Cody Braun (vocals/fiddle/mandolin/harmonica), the alternative country-rock outfit Reckless Kelly formed in Stanley, Idaho in February 1996 before moving to Austin, Texas. The Brauns had previously toured with their father in Muzzie Braun & the Boys, a Western swing band, and were joined in their own group by the lead guitarist Casey Pollock, the bass guitarist Chris Schelske and the drummer Jay Nazz.

With their younger brothers Micky and Gary, Cody and Willy were raised in central Idaho near the Sawtooth Mountains, between Clayton and Challis in Custer County, and were homeschooled by their mother. Originally they were "Muzzie Braun & the Little Braun Brothers", as Muzzie and his brothers Gary and Billy were the "Braun Brothers" from Twin Falls in the 1970s and early 1980s, sons of the musician Eustaceus "Mustie" Braun (1917–1981). From North Dakota, Mustie was a neighbor and relative of the bandleader Lawrence Welk, and was a keyboard player during the last days of legalized gambling in Idaho at Weiser in the early 1950s. He then moved to the new Club 93 in Jackpot, Nevada, on the Idaho border, and moved his family to Twin Falls, about fifty miles (80 km) north. In February 1981, Mustie and wife Marian (née Beckman) were involved in a head-on collision north of Jackpot, and both died from their injuries.

In 1989, Muzzie and his sons appeared on Johnny Carson's Tonight Show twice.

Reckless Kelly played locally on the historic Sixth Street in Austin. They turned Lucy's Retired Surfers Bar, a small bar and restaurant, into a noted music venue. From November 1996 to May 1998, they filled the venue with their Monday night show. During this period, other music venues in Austin invited them to play, including the Continental Club, the Saxon pub, Stubb's barbecue, and Antone's home of the blues.

Reckless Kelly's first album, Millican, appeared in fall 1997 and was officially released in 1998. Acoustic: Live at Stubb's and The Day followed two years later, after which David Abeyta replaced Pollock on lead guitar. Under the Table & Above the Sun in 2003 began the band's relationship with the high-profile Sugar Hill label and won the hearts of the music press and the honky tonkin' legend Joe Ely, who sang the band's praises in interviews. Wicked Twisted Road was released in 2005, and the next year the live album Reckless Kelly Was Here captured the band's stage presence. Bulletproof was released in summer 2008 on a new label, Yep Roc Records, and includes tracks critical of and reflecting on recent sociopolitical unfoldings, such as the Iraq War and Hurricane Katrina. In 2010, Reckless released an album of songs by one of their musical heroes, Pinto Bennett. Somewhere in Time, in the band's own words, highlighted their love of "straight-up honky tonk". The band regularly returns to Austin to play before capacity crowds at venues like Nutty Brown Cafe & Amphitheatre.

Younger brothers Micky and Gary Braun front their own band, Micky & The Motorcars. Both bands play at the annual Braun Brothers Reunion in Challis, Idaho, in August.

Discography

Studio albums

Live albums

Compilations

Music videos

Current members
 Willy Braun (lead vocals, guitar, harmonica )
 Cody Braun (vocals, fiddle, mandolin, harmonica)
 Jay "Nazziola" Nazz (drums)
 Joe Miller (bass guitar)
 Geoffrey Queen (lead guitar)

Former members
 Casey Pollock (lead guitar)
 Jimmy "Jam" McFeeley (bass guitar)
 Chris "Shifty" Schelske (bass guitar)
 David Abeyta (lead guitar, vocals)

References

External links
 
 
 Michael Corcoran.net – 'Reckless' Braun brothers
 Braun Brothers Reunion – Challis, Idaho

American country rock groups
Musical groups from Austin, Texas
Country music groups from Texas
Rock music groups from Texas
Musical groups established in 1997
Yep Roc Records artists